The 1971 UC Santa Barbara Gauchos football team represented the University of California, Santa Barbara (UCSB) as a member of the Pacific Coast Athletic Association (PCAA) during the 1971 NCAA University Division football season. Led by Andy Everest in his second and final season as head coach, the Gauchos compiled an overall record of 3–8 with a mark of 2–3 in conference play, tying for fourth place in the PCAA. The team played home games at Campus Stadium in Santa Barbara, California.

Citing financial problems, UCSB drop football as an intercollegiate sport after the 1971 season. The school did not field another football team until 1983, when a student-run club team was formed. Competition sanctioned by the National Collegiate Athletic Association (NCAA) did not resume until 1986.

Schedule

Team players in the NFL
The following Santa Barbara Gaucho players were selected in the 1972 NFL Draft.

References

UC Santa Barbara
UC Santa Barbara Gauchos football seasons
UC Santa Barbara Gauchos football